Anna Sophia (variants include Anna Sophie, Anna Sofia, and AnnaSophia) is a feminine given name and may refer to:

Royalty
 Anna Sophia I, Abbess of Quedlinburg (1619-1680)
 Anna Sophia II, Abbess of Quedlinburg (1638–1683)
 Anna Sophia of Prussia (1527–1591), German noblewoman
 Princess Anna Sophie of Denmark (1647–1717), eldest daughter of King Frederick III of Denmark
 Anna Sophie of Saxe-Gotha-Altenburg (1670–1728)
 Anna Sophie of Anhalt (1584–1652)
 Anna Sophia van Schönborn, Countess of Hoensbroek (c. 1696–1760)

Other people
 Anna Sophia Berglund (born 1986), American Playboy model and actress
 Anna Sophia Folch (born 1985), Brazilian actress
 Anna Sophia Hagman (1758–1826), Swedish ballet dancer
 Anna Sophia Holmstedt (1759–1807), Swedish ballet dancer and translator
 Anna Sophia Polak (1874–1943), Jewish feminist and author
 Anna Sofia Ramström (1738–1786), Lady's maid of the Queen of Sweden, Sophie Magdalena of Denmark
 AnnaSophia Robb (born 1993), American actress, model, and singer
 Anna Sofia Sevelin (1790–1871), Swedish opera singer
 Anna Sophie Schack (1689–1760), Danish noble, landowner and builder

Feminine given names
Compound given names